Three, stylized as +HR=E, is a New Zealand nationwide television channel. Launched on 26 November 1989 as TV3, it was New Zealand's first privately owned television channel. The channel currently broadcasts nationally (with regional advertising targeting four markets) in digital free-to-air form via the state-owned Kordia on terrestrial and satellite. Vodafone also carries the channel for their cable subscribers in Wellington and Christchurch. It previously broadcast nationally on analogue television until that was switched off on 1 December 2013.

Three is a general entertainment channel owned by Warner Bros. Discovery, with a significant news and current affairs element under the banner of Newshub. Three carries a significant amount of local content, most of which airs at prime-time.

History

Establishment

Applications to apply for a warrant to operate New Zealand's third national television network opened in 1985. The Broadcasting Tribunal announced in 1987 that TVWorks, parent company of TV3, had won the warrant. TV3 initially aimed to provide a regionally based television service, with linked studios based in each of the four areas (Auckland, Wellington, Waikato/BOP, and South Island).

There were numerous delays to the launch date of TV3. Litigation surrounded the granting of the warrant, as did the share market crash in October 1987, which wiped out a large proportion of the capital that TV3 required to establish the channel. The then Minister of Broadcasting, Richard Prebble, announced in late 1987 that much of the UHF spectrum in New Zealand was to be auctioned to allow for an increased number of television channels, resulting in a reduction in the value of TV3's warrant due to the increased competition. The drawn-out tribunal process of frequency allocation that TV3 had just won would be replaced by a bidding process that would allocate frequencies in weeks rather than months or even years.

These problems resulted in the ambitious regional plans being rationalised before being shelved completely. The network was to be based in Auckland with limited studios and news and sales teams in the other main centres.Broadcasting started on 26 November 1989 at 8:00 pm with a preview of what viewers could expect to see. After Governor-General Paul Reeves officially launched the station, the first broadcast was a two-hour special previewing the network's programmes featuring comedians David McPhail and Jon Gadsby playing cameramen. TV3's initial slogan proclaimed 'Come Home to the Feeling'; a derivative of the 'Come Home to the Best, Only on NBC' slogan used by NBC in the United States at the time. At time of launch about 60 percent of the New Zealand audience could receive TV3's regular broadcasts. Regular broadcasts began the following day, 27 November 1989, at 7:00 am.

Early in TV3's life, financial supporters of the network included ABC and NBC as a minority shareholding, who later sold their interest.

Westpac ownership
TV3 failed to gain ground against a recently revitalised TVNZ and was placed into receivership on 2 May 1990. TV3 continued to broadcast with the major creditor, Westpac, supporting the network by taking a large shareholding.

As TV3 needed investment during a climate of economic recession, the government liberalised the rules on foreign ownership of television stations (raising the 15 percent cap to 49 percent and later removing all restrictions), allowing TV3 to search for an investor overseas. In December 1991, Canwest took a 20 percent shareholding in TV3 and secured a management agreement allowing it full control to operate the station. Canwest introduced tighter controls on budgets while targeting the lucrative 18- to 49-year-old audience. TV3's audience share and advertising revenue steadily increased, leading to significant profits. TV3 also steadily increased its coverage within New Zealand, adding dozens of transmitters and translators, often with the assistance of New Zealand On Air. By 1998 about 97 percent of the population could receive the channel.

On 2 October 1996, TV3 announced a reshuffling of its broadcast frequencies to enable it to launch a new network, to be called TV4 Network Limited, on the VHF band. TV4, which started on 29 June 1997, is a free-to-air network aimed at a younger audience than TV3. The launch was considered successful, with high brand recognition and ratings significantly higher than MTV, TV4's television rival. TV4's opening broadcast was the controversial Tyson–Holyfield boxing rematch.

Canwest ownership
In April 1997 Canwest purchased Westpac's 48 percent shareholding in TV3, taking Canwest's stake to 68 percent. In June Canwest picked up the More FM Radio network, followed in November with the purchase of the remaining 32 percent of TV3. In April 1998, Canwest announced that it had made Can$22 million in the six months to February 1998 in New Zealand, up a third on the same period the year before. TV4 contributed positively to the result, with some of the increase due to the inclusion of More FM, while TV3 was continuing to experience strong revenue growth.

Canwest's investments in New Zealand had developed considerably in New Zealand over the period that it had interests in the country. TV4 continued to be a source of concern for the broadcaster, but the position of TV3 was strengthened by alliances with Sky Television for sport and a series of high-profile mistakes by TVNZ as it dealt with the dominance of Sky in pay television. The election of the Labour government in 1999 refocused TVNZ as a semi-non-commercial broadcaster, no longer ratings-driven and no longer attempting to dominate the free to air television market. As a commercial broadcaster, TV3 was in a position to take advantage of TVNZ's change of focus.

During 2004 the station was transferred into the ownership of Canwest MediaWorks (NZ) as a way of listing 30 percent of the Canadian company's New Zealand assets on the New Zealand share market. TV3's parent company TVWorks announced its annual revenue at $124 million in October 2004, which was $13 million up from the previous financial year.

MediaWorks ownership
In May 2007 it was announced that Ironbridge Capital, an Australian private equity firm, was paying $386 million or $2.43 a share for the 70 percent of CanWest MediaWorks (NZ) owned by CanWest Global Communications. It was also offering the same price to minority shareholders under a full takeover bid.

On 1 April 2008, TV3 became the first New Zealand television network to introduce high-definition television, to coincide with the launch of Freeview HD and MySky HDi in New Zealand. The first programme to broadcast in true 1080i high definition (i.e. not upscaled) was that night's screening of Boston Legal.

On 17 June 2013 the parent company of TV3 went into receivership, this being the second receivership for TV3. When TV3's parent company MediaWorks was purchased by Ironbridge Capital they took on $700 Million of debt which could no longer be sustained. Following the receivership TV3 and the radio stations owned by MediaWorks remained on air and all staff have retained their jobs. Shares in the company were gradually and completely bought out by US hedge fund Oaktree Capital Management.

Since 3 July 2016, with the closure of sister channel Four, some of its programming, such as Sticky TV, moved over to TV3 in a new daytime lineup.

On 9 February 2017, TV3 underwent a major re-branding, changing its name to Three and adopting a new logo and on-air imaging. The new brand was promoted as being "vibrant, playful, and inspiring"; chief content officer Andrew Szusterman explained that TV3 as a brand had not evolved with its programming, and that "a channel this strong, with content this strong, should be bigger than the sum of its parts and it should represent the content itself whereas the pieces of content were living in isolation." The new imaging was widely criticized by viewers, particularly the unusual design and stylization of its new logo as "+HR=E".

A second sister channel, ThreeLife, was launched on 15 April 2018.

On 18 October 2019, MediaWorks announced Three was for sale.

On 25 March 2020, ThreeLife and ThreeLife + 1 went off air, and were replaced by the return of The Edge TV and new channel Breeze TV.

Discovery, Inc. ownership
In early September 2020, MediaWorks confirmed that it would be selling its television media assets, which include Three, to the US mass media multinational company Discovery, Inc.

On 1 December 2020, Discovery, Inc acquired Three as part of its acquisition of MediaWorks' television assets, which also included the sister channels The Edge TV, The Breeze TV and Bravo, as well as news service Newshub. In April 2022, Discovery merged with WarnerMedia to form Warner Bros. Discovery.

Content

Output contracts
Mediaworks acquired a first-run and re-run contract with HD sourced material for 20th Century Fox Television content (which includes films under the brands 20th Century Fox, DreamWorks Animation – 2008 to present, Fox Atomic, Fox Searchlight Pictures, Icon Films – 2007 to 2012, now belongs to Prime Television New Zealand and Regency Enterprises), which was previously held by TVNZ. When TVNZ outbid them for their previous Disney Media Distribution contract. In 2015, they had the rights to Metro Goldwyn Mayer for more recent films.

Exclusive contracts with CBS News, ITV News and Seven News for international news coverage.

Mediaworks has long held first-option contracts with NBC Universal (which includes films under the brands Focus Features and Universal Pictures) with select HD material from February 2011. As well as until the start of the US 2012 season, a first-option contract with CBS Television Distribution (which included films under the brands Paramount Pictures and non-animated DreamWorks Pictures) with select HD material from the end of 2012, this deal came to an end for new content from the start of 2013. From mid-2013, TV3 secured a first option deal with Sony Pictures Television for new content for TV series and movies that will be scheduled for late 2013 and the 2014 season. This deal signals a move away from the more expensive exclusive Fox deal, which is still under re-negotiation following the broadcaster's change in ownership.

On 20 December 2013, MediaWorks re-signed a revised down scaled exclusive deal with Fox. As a result of their receivership, they lost their first-option rights over NBCUniversal shows, which resulted in TVNZ acquiring the rights to Brooklyn Nine Nine in 2014. They also lost their rights to air 20th Television programmes, which resulted Prime Television New Zealand to air Sleepy Hollow, and Television New Zealand to air Empire.

Broadcasting details
From launch in November 1989 until digital television transition was completed on 1 December 2013, TV3 broadcast terrestrially using the analogue PAL-B&G. Except for Kapiti where it broadcast on ITU Band IV (UHF), TV3 broadcast in the main urban areas on ITU band III (VHF high). In other areas and infill transmitters in the main urban areas, it broadcast on either band I (VHF low), band III, band IV or band V (UHF). In some areas, TV3's analogue broadcast was on a different transmitter from TV One and TV2's analogue broadcasts, and viewers needed an additional antenna to pick up the channel; these included Hamilton, Tauranga, Taupo, Gisborne, Kapiti, Masterton, and Nelson.

Three is a broadcasting member of the Freeview platform as well as broadcasting on Sky. TV3 began screening widescreen transmissions on both platforms on 11 April 2007, although TelstraClear InHomeTV which got most of its content from Sky, switched back to screening the cropped version of TV3 for a couple of months due to non-widescreen customer complaints. TelstraClear resumed broadcasting the widescreen version of TV3 on 24 July 2007. In April 2008 TV3 commenced 1080i high definition broadcasts on the Freeview terrestrial platform and on Sky's HD satellite platform.

Three also broadcasts a livestream of the Auckland feed on its ThreeNow website and app.

ThreeNow

ThreeNow (previously called 3Now) is an on-demand streaming platform, on which select programmes from Three and sister channels Bravo, eden, Rush and HGTV, as well as web-only programmes, are available. ThreeNow is available on the ThreeNow website as well as on iOS and Android devices. It also has live streams of Three and sister channels Bravo, eden & Rush.

ThreeNow's content library hosts several New Zealand and international programmes including Law & Order: SVU, Blue Bloods, Come Dine with Me New Zealand, Below Deck Mediterranean, Dancing with the Stars, Googlebox, Chicago Med, Australia's Best Houses, and Hawaii Five-O. The streaming service also hosts content from Newshub.

ThreePlus1

ThreePlus1 (previously called TV3 Plus 1) is a 1-hour timeshift channel. It was launched on 30 March 2009, as part of Three's contract with Freeview to provide at least four channels. It is a standard hour delayed timeshift channel of the Three broadcast taken from their Auckland feed that was created originally for the Sky platform, meaning the channel broadcasts Auckland regional advertising. ThreePlus1 is available on digital terrestrial and digital satellite.

Defunct

ThreeLife

ThreeLife was a New Zealand nationwide television channel that was launched on 15 April 2018. It aired lifestyle shows. The content aired on ThreeLife was themed, as follows:

 Monday: Taste Life
 Tuesday: Explore Life
 Wednesday: Fast Life 
 Thursday: DIY Life
 Friday: Love Life
 Saturday: Lifestyle
 Sunday: Wild Life

Good Chef Bad Chef, Everyday Gourmet with Justine Schofield and The Home Team were aired from 6pm to 7:30pm every night. During the day, the channel repeated programmes from the previous night. These aired from 9am on Monday through Friday, from 11:30am on Saturday, and from 6am on Sunday. From midnight to 6 am, a simulcast of Magic Talk was broadcast.

ThreeLife was shut down at the end of 25 March 2020, and was replaced by the return of The Edge TV a little over an hour later. The final show to air on ThreeLife was Good Chef Bad Chef.

ThreeLife + 1 
ThreeLife + 1 was a 1-hour timeshift channel. It was launched on 1 July 2019, in the place of The Edge TV. The station was shut down at 1 am on 26 March 2020, and was replaced on 16 April by The Breeze TV.

References

External links

Television channels in New Zealand
Television channels and stations established in 1989
English-language television stations in New Zealand
Warner Bros. Discovery networks
Warner Bros. Discovery Asia-Pacific
1989 establishments in New Zealand